Ludlow is a  civil parish in  Northumberland County, New Brunswick, Canada.

For governance purposes it is part of the  incorporated rural community of  Upper Miramichi, which is a member of the  Greater Miramichi Regional Service Commission (GMRSC). Before the creation of Upper Miramichi in 1971, Ludlow Parish was a local service district.

Origin of name
Ludlow was named in honour of the Ludlow brothers.

The Ludlow brothers were prominent  Loyalist judges and members of the Executive Council of New Brunswick. George Duncan was appointed first Chief Justice of the Supreme Court of New Brunswick, while younger brother Gabriel George was first Mayor of  Saint John; both died in 1808.  Carleton Parish, named for their political ally Thomas Carleton, first  Governor of New Brunswick, was erected simultaneously.

History
Ludlow was erected in 1814 from unassigned territory in the western part of the county plus a strip of  Newcastle Parish.

Ludlow included  Blackville and  Blissfield Parishes plus the western part of  Kent County until 1830.

Boundaries
Ludlow Parish is bounded:

 on the north by a line beginning at a point on the  York County line near McConnell Brook, then running north 72º east by an  astronomic bearing to the northeastern corner of  Blackville Parish, a point 537  chains (10.8 kilometres) from the Canadian National Railway line through Quarryville on a line running north 22º west from the mouth of the Renous River;
 on the east by a line running north and south from the mouth of Big Hole Brook, which is on the western edge of  Doaktown;
 on the south by the  Sunbury and York County lines;
 on the west by the York County line.

Evolution of boundaries
The eastern line of Blackville Parish, prolongated to  Westmorland County, was the original eastern line of Ludlow, putting most of  Harcourt and  Huskisson Parishes in Ludlow. The northern line was further south, putting much of  Route 108 in  Northesk Parish.

In 1830 Ludlow was split three ways, with the eastern part becoming  Blackville Parish and the central part becoming  Blissfield Parish, while the northern line was moved roughly where it is today.

Changes in the wording of the boundary with  Northesk Parish and later  Southesk Parish in 1850, 1877, and 1954 made little if any difference in the parish line.

Communities
Communities at least partly within the parish. all communities are part of the  incorporated rural community of  Upper Miramichi

 Amostown
  Bettsburg
 Big Hole Brook
  Boiestown
  Carrolls Crossing
  Holtville
  Ludlow
  McNamee
  Nelson Hollow
 New Bandon
 O'Donnells
 Porter Brook
 Porter Cove
  Priceville

Bodies of water
Bodies of water at least partly within the parish.

 Bartholomew River
 Dungarvon River
 Boars Head Narrows
 Little Dungarvon River
 Renous River
 Southwest Miramichi River
 Longs Creek
 Indian Village Lake
 Lake of the Plains
 more than 15 other officially named lakes

Islands
Islands at least partly within the parish.

 Amos Islands
 Boiestown Islands
 Clems Island
 Lyons Island
 McCarty Island
 O'Donnell Island
 Porcupine Island
 Portage Island
 Suter Island
 Sand Plum Bar

Other notable places
Parks, historic sites, and other noteworthy places at least partly within the parish.
 Dungarvon Protected Natural Area
 Plaster Rock-Renous Wildlife Management Area
 Spud Brook Protected Natural Area

Demographics

Population
Population trend

Language
Mother tongue language (2006)

See also
List of parishes in New Brunswick

Notes

References

External links
 Upper Miramichi Rural Community

Parishes of Northumberland County, New Brunswick